The Curtis R. Priem Experimental Media and Performing Arts Center (EMPAC) is a multi-venue arts center at Rensselaer Polytechnic Institute in Troy, New York, which opened on October 3, 2008. The building is named after Curtis Priem, co-founder of NVIDIA and graduate of the RPI Class of 1982, who donated $40 million to the Institute in 2004.

Role on campus of a technological university
The Center is a significant change in focus from the traditional focus on this science and engineering campus, although the Darrin Communication Center is similar. The administration claims that "EMPAC introduces a new model for educating the next generation of leaders, who will be better prepared to solve the complex problems facing our world.”

Architecture and facilities
The design architect for the EMPAC is Grimshaw Architects, London and New York, designers of The Eden Project, the London School of Economics, and International Terminal Waterloo. The architect of record is the New York City architectural firm Davis Brody Bond. The engineers for the project are Buro Happold.

The main concert hall seats 1,200, and has been lauded as one of the most acoustically perfect concert halls in the world. The acoustical firm Kirkegaard Associates was contracted to work on the system. Extensive computer modeling was done of the ceiling canopy before construction to optimize the transmission of sound waves. EMPAC is the first venue to use Nomex fire-retardant fabric for a ceiling canopy to reflect sound waves. Grown in sustainable forests in British Columbia, the wood was chosen for its fire-retardant properties. A  glass wall lines the north side of the building. A water/glycol mix circulating through the steel support beams maintains an even temperature and limits condensation on the glass. EMPAC is also LEED Silver certified.

EMPAC is also home to a 400-seat theater with an 80′ x 40′ stage, 60′ fly tower, and computer controlled rigging. EMPAC also has two very large projection screens: a 50' x 40' one in the theater and a 60' wide screen in the concert hall. There are two main multi-purpose studio spaces. There is also a  rehearsal studio called Studio Beta, and 4 Artist-in-Residence studios (with one being permanently occupied by the Institute President). Studio 1 and Studio 2 are lined with acoustical panels to diffuse sound using innovative paneling designed to simulate the characteristics of tree bark. Different panels are designed to absorb and refract different frequencies of sound. All performance spaces have a maximum noise level of 15 dB, making them some of the quietest artistic presentation spaces in the world.

A 360-degree projection system has been developed, which is used for virtual reality research, art works, and cinematic presentations. Special 360-degree cameras are used for filming, along with microphones which record directionality. The sound can then be played back on an array of surround-sound speakers, allowing sound projection from any angle toward the audience. EMPAC's first commission, entitled THERE IS STILL TIME..BROTHER, by The Wooster Group, began at EMPAC and then left to tour internationally.

Founding staff
The founding director of EMPAC is Johannes Goebel, who led it from 2002 through 2022. Prior to EMPAC, Goebel was previously the director and founder of the Institute for Music and Acoustics at the Center for Art and Media Technology (ZKM) in Karlsruhe, Germany. EMPAC's curatorial team includes Victoria Brooks, Senior Curator of Time-Based Visual Arts, Dr. Ashley Ferro-Murray, Senior Curator of Dance and Theater, and Amadeus Julian Regucera, Curator of Music. The founding curatorial team included Kathleen Forde, Curator, Time-Based Arts, Helene Lesterlin, Curator Dance/Theater, and Micah Silver, Curator, Music.

Construction
The institute announced plans for the construction of a new performance hall in Fall of 2001 with construction costs originally slated at $50 million. After a design competition and discussions with architectural firms, the plans were revised with a new construction cost of $141 million and completion date of sometime in 2006. While some thought that RPI needed improved music and arts facilities, the increased size and construction cost were seen as unnecessarily expensive by many students and faculty.

The project broke ground on September 19, 2003. During 2004 the Institute began a large capital campaign and Rensselaer alumnus and trustee Curtis Priem, '82, donated $40 million in an unrestricted gift. RPI decided to officially name the project in his honor. Additionally, the Institute received a $1 million gift for EMPAC programs from alumnus David Jaffe in 2006.

Over 100,000 cubic yards of earth were evacuated from the hill to make room for the structure. RPI has had problems in the past with the instability of the ground on the hillside, a phenomenon known as mass wasting. To prevent the EMPAC from "sliding down the hill", 215 rock anchors were drilled into the ground to stabilize the foundations.

In September 2005, the institute hosted EMPAC 360: On Site + Sound, a multimedia and performing arts presentation to celebrate the midpoint of construction. The event was attended by over 3000 people from the region. The expected completion date was moved to sometime in 2008. 
In January 2008, RPI commissioned lighting designer Jennifer Tipton to create a large lighting display called "Light Above the Hudson". Operational for several weeks, the display drew attention to the center with a 300 by  array of multicolored lights and search lights pointed into the sky.

The grand opening celebrations were held on three weekends from October 3 to October 19, 2008, with all events free to the public.  The inaugural concert was programmed by Micah Silver and Johannes Goebel on October 4 and was a seamless concert that included the Albany Symphony Orchestra with pianist Per Tengstrand, the International Contemporary Ensemble and Vox Vocal Ensemble performing spatial music ranging four hundred years of music composition. Performances were also given by the Norwegian group Verdensteatret, the Japanese collective Dumb Type and a duet performance by pianist Cecil Taylor with Pauline Oliveros a poetry reading by Taylor, and a party DJ'd by Madlib. October 11 was alumni weekend and featured  Jazz at Lincoln Center Orchestra with Wynton Marsalis, and October 18 was family weekend and featured Gamelan Galak Tikka, the Ensemble Robot and the Roy Haynes Fountain of Youth Band. Each weekend also contained numerous lectures and workshops including Johannes Goebel and Pauline Oliveros. Studio 1 Goodman Studio/Theater hosted a special 360-degree film by The Wooster Group entitled There is Still Time..Brother alternating with screenings by Workspace Unlimited.

Gallery

References

External links

EMPAC Main Page
EMPAC Calendar of Events
Simulated Pictures of the EMPAC building
 

Concert halls in New York (state)
Buildings and structures in Troy, New York
Music venues in New York (state)
Rensselaer Polytechnic Institute
Tourist attractions in Rensselaer County, New York
Performing arts centers in New York (state)
University and college arts centers in the United States
Nicholas Grimshaw buildings
Buildings and structures completed in 2008